Scelodonta congoana is a species of leaf beetle of the Democratic Republic of the Congo. It was first described by Julius Weise in 1915, from specimens collected from Ubangi District in 1910.

References

Eumolpinae
Beetles of the Democratic Republic of the Congo
Beetles described in 1915
Taxa named by Julius Weise
Endemic fauna of the Democratic Republic of the Congo